Baron Jules Victor Anspach (20 July 1829 – 19 May 1879) was a Belgian politician and mayor of the City of Brussels, best known for his renovations surrounding the covering of the river Senne (1867–1871). He is buried in Brussels Cemetery.

Anspach was born in Brussels into a family of Calvinist Genevan origin. His father François (died 1858) served in the Belgian Chamber of Representatives. Jules Anspach studied law at the Free University of Brussels (now split into the Université Libre de Bruxelles and the Vrije Universiteit Brussel) becoming a Doctor of Laws.  As with many Liberals, Anspach was a Freemason. Like his father, Anspach was elected to the Chamber of Representatives.

Anspach rose rapidly, replacing Fontainas as mayor of Brussels in 1863, aged only 34, holding the office until his death in 1879. He effected massive changes to the urban landscape of Brussels, centred on his oeuvre, the covering of the Senne. His renovations in Brussels paralleled those by Baron Haussmann in Paris. The modern city remains largely Anspach's creation in its basic form.

The Boulevard Anspach/Anspachlaan, one of the central boulevards created by his massive renovations of the city, and the main artery in downtown Brussels today, bears his name.

See also
 List of mayors of the City of Brussels
Belgian nobility

References

Further reading
 Hall, Thomas, Planning Europe's Capital Cities: Aspects of Nineteenth-century Urban Development. Taylor & Francis, 1997.
 Schuiten, François & Benoît Peeters, Brüsel. Casterman, 1992.
  Witte, Els (ed.), De Brusselse negentien gemeenten en het Brussels model/Les dix-neuf communes bruxelloises et le modèle bruxellois. Larcier, 2003.

1829 births
1879 deaths
Politicians from Brussels
Mayors of the City of Brussels

Free University of Brussels (1834–1969) alumni
Burials at Brussels Cemetery